Limnology and Oceanography (L&O) is a bimonthly peer-reviewed scientific journal focused on all aspects of limnology and oceanography. It was established in 1956 and originally published through the Association for the Sciences of Limnology and Oceanography (ASLO), and now published in partnership with John Wiley and Sons. Occasionally, L&O publishes special issues focused on a specific topic in aquatic systems in addition to the six regular issues published each year.

List of editors 
 David Frey (19561959)
 Kenneth Rae (19591963)
 Francis Richards (1963-1967)
 Yvette Hardman Edmondson (19671986)
 Peter Jumars (19861992)
 David Kirchman (19921998)
 Everett Fee (19982014)
 Robert W. Howarth (20142019)
K. David Hambright (2019 )

References

External links

English-language journals
Bimonthly journals
Publications established in 1956